Amtala is a village in Kamrup district, situated in the south bank of the river Brahmaputra.

Transport
The village is near National Highway 17 (India) and connected to nearby towns and cities like Bijoynagar, Chaygaon and Guwahati with regular buses and other modes of transportation.

See also
 Aradanga

References

Villages in Kamrup district